Bigg Boss 12, also known as Bigg Boss: Vichitra Jodis is the twelfth season of the Indian reality TV series Bigg Boss which is based on the Dutch series Big Brother, and premiered on 16 September 2018 on Colors. The launch episode was titled "Bigg Night". Salman Khan hosted the season for the ninth time. The grand finale of the show took place on 30 December 2018 and Dipika Kakar was announced as the winner whereas Sreesanth became the runner up .

Production

Background
Colors TV invited the general public to send their video clips through a streaming application called Voot on 15 April in order to audition for the show. It was later revealed by the show makers that this season of the show would feature contestants in pairs (any sort of pairs; friends, co-workers, spouses, siblings, etc.), therefore declaring the theme "Vichitra Jodis", which translates to "Strange Pairs".

Eye logo
The Bigg Boss "eye" is split, with red on one side and blue on the other; red representing fire and blue representing water.

House
House pictures were officially released on 16 September 2018; the House followed the theme of a "Beach House".

Bigg Boss: Outhouse

Four housemates entered the Bigg Boss Outhouse a day before the start of the show. The public had power to vote two housemate into the main house. Exclusive videos from the out-house were streaming on Voot from 15 September 2018.  Surbhi Rana, Kriti Verma, Roshmi Banik and Mital Joshi were called into the house with a task called "Taala Khol", where one of the pairs were to be eliminated on the very first day of the show.

Housemates status

Outhouse Status

Housemates

Original entrants
The participants in the order of appearance and entrance in the house are:
 Karanvir Bohra – Television actor and reality television star. He is known for his performances in Kasautii Zindagii Kay, Dil Se Di Dua... Saubhagyavati Bhava?, Qubool Hai and Naagin 2. He was a contestant on Nach Baliye and Khatron Ke Khiladi 5.
 Saurabh Patel – Farmer and a struggling actor. He was an assistant casting director for many television shows.
 Shivashish Mishra – Businessman, model and struggling actor. He had a role in SET show Sankat mochan Mahabali Hanuman.
 Dipika Kakar – Television and film actress, reality television star. She became a household name with her portrayal of Simar Dwivedi Bhardwaj in the long-running soap opera Sasural Simar Ka on Colors TV, and participated in Jhalak Dikhhla Jaa 8 and Nach Baliye, before making her Bollywood debut with the patriotic drama film Paltan (2018).
 Romil Chaudhary – Lawyer from Haryana. He is also a rapper and reality television personality.
 Nirmal Singh – Policeman from Haryana.
 Neha Pendse – Television and film actress. She is known for her role of Sanjana in the Life OK comedy show  May I Come In Madam?
 Anup Jalota – Popular singer who has also sung occasionally for Hindi films. He was the host for a Star Plus show called Dharam Aur Hum.
 Jasleen Matharu – Singer. She made her singing debut with Sukhwinder Singh in the song "Naachunga Saari Raat".
 Srishty Rode – Television actress. She has appeared in several television shows including Saraswatichandra, Yeh Ishq Haaye, Punar Vivah - Ek Nayi Umeed and Ishqbaaaz.
 Somi Khan – Actress, Sales manager.
 Saba Khan – Actress, Front office manager in Hotel. She previously worked with a five-star chain of hotels including Taj Group, Alila Fort Bishangarh etc.
 Deepak Thakur – Singer for Bollywood director Anurag Kashyap's films.
 Urvashi Vani – Singer, Deepak Thakur's fangirl.
 Kriti Verma – GST Inspector. She participated in the reality show MTV Roadies (season 15).
 Roshmi Banik – Businesswomen.
 Shanthakumaran Sreesanth – Former Indian cricketer, reality show star, politician, and now an actor. He participated in Jhalak Dikhhla Jaa 7.

Wild Card entrants
 Surbhi Rana – Dentist. She was a contestant on MTV Roadies 15.
  Megha Dhade – Television and Marathi film actress. She appeared in shows like Kasautii Zindagii Kay, Pehchaan and Kasturi. In 2018, she won Bigg Boss Marathi in the first season of the Marathi version of Bigg Boss.
 Rohit Suchanti – Television actor. He was noticed and appreciated for his work in Saath Nibhaana Saathiya and Rishta Likhenge Hum Naya.

Outhouse entrants

Weekly Summary

Guest appearances

Nominations table

  indicates that the Housemate was directly nominated for eviction.
  indicates that the Housemate was immune prior to nominations.
  indicates the winner.
  indicates the first runner up.
  indicates the second runner up.
  indicates the third runner up.
  indicates the fourth runner up.
  indicates the contestant has been evicted.
  indicates the contestant walked out due to emergency.
  indicates the contestant has been ejected.
  house captain.
  indicates the contestant is nominated.

Nomination notes
: The single housemates had to nominate three pairs of the duo housemates and duo housemates had to nominate two of the single housemates. Single housemates chose Dipika and Srishty. Duo housemates chose Kriti, Roshmi; Shivashish, Sourabh and Saba, Somi.
: Kriti, Roshmi were not given immunity even after they were captains, due to not following house rules.
: Prior to nominations, Kriti, Roshmi had special power to immune a pair or a single from nominations.
: Singles were only allowed to nominate pairs and pairs were only allowed to nominate singles.
: Singles had to demand for something from the Jodi given by Bigg Boss, if the demand was satisfied Jodi was safe & single was nominated, but if not satisfied Jodi was nominated & signal was safe.

References

External links

 Official Website

2018 Indian television seasons
12